Anthony L. Komaroff (born June 7, 1941) is an American physician, clinical investigator, editor, and publisher. He serves as the Distinguished Simcox-Clifford-Higby Professor of Medicine at Harvard Medical School and Senior Physician at Brigham and Women's Hospital in Boston.

Early life
Anthony L. (Tony) Komaroff was raised in Los Angeles, California. He attended college at Stanford University and medical school at the University of Washington in Seattle.

Career
Following medical school, he received training in internal medicine at Harvard Medical School and then joined the faculty.

Komaroff was the Director of the Division of General Medicine and Primary Care at Brigham & Women's Hospital, Boston MA, from 1982 to 1997, and built one of the world’s renowned academic general medicine units. From 1982 to 1987, he was the vice president for management systems of Brigham and Women's Hospital, with oversight of the Hospital's computer systems.  From 1997 through January 2015, he served as Editor-in-Chief of the Harvard Health Publications Division (HHP) of Harvard Medical School, the division responsible for publishing all of the School's health information for the general public—books, newsletters, Internet content and doctors' office information. The information is published in multiple languages, in countries around the world .

Komaroff has published over 280 research articles and book chapters, and two books. His early publications cover the development of clinical algorithms, cost-effectiveness analyses of primary care practices, and clinical research on common respiratory and urinary infections,.  In recent decades, Dr. Komaroff’s research has focused on chronic fatigue syndrome  and also on human herpesvirus 6.

Komaroff was the Editor in Chief of the best-selling book, the Harvard Medical School Family Health Guide; is the founding editor of NEJM Journal Watch, a publication of the New England Journal of Medicine ; is the editor-in-chief of the Harvard Health Letter, a newsletter from Harvard Medical School for the general public ; and from 2011-December 2016 was the author of a daily newspaper column, Ask Doctor K, that was syndicated by United Media and appeared in over 400 newspapers in North America. In these publications, and in medical journals, he describes the latest developments in biological science and medical research to both practicing health professionals and the general public.

Finally, Komaroff also served as editor of the autobiographies of two biomedical scientists, Nobel Laureates Joseph E. Murray and Thomas H. Weller.

Komaroff serves as the Distinguished Simcox-Clifford-Higby Professor of Medicine at Harvard Medical School and Senior Physician at Brigham and Women's Hospital in Boston .

Honors
 Elected a fellow of the American Association for the Advancement of Science, the American College of Physicians, and the Association for Health Services Research.
 Served on advisory committees for the United States Department of Health and Human Services, the Surgeon General of the United States, the Centers for Disease Control and Prevention, and the Institute of Medicine/National Academy of Sciences.
 Currently a member of the Scientific Advisory Board of the HHV-6 Foundation.

References

External links
 Harvard Health Publications, Harvard Medical School
 Harvard Catalyst Profile
 HHV-6 Foundation Scientific Advisory Board
 Ask Doctor K, Harvard Medical School

American primary care physicians
1941 births
Living people